Seville is an unincorporated community in Fulton County, Illinois, United States. Seville is located on Illinois Route 95, west of Smithfield. It is served by Keokuk Junction Railway.

History

References

Unincorporated communities in Fulton County, Illinois
Unincorporated communities in Illinois